Leptospermum crassifolium is a species of shrub that is endemic to the Budawang Range in New South Wales. It has thin, rough bark that is shed annually, broadly elliptic leaves, white flowers borne singly on short side branches, and woody fruit.

Description
Flowering occurs in February and the fruit is a woody capsule  in diameter that remains on the plant with the sepals attached.

Taxonomy and naming
Leptospermum crassifolium was first formally described in 1989 by Joy Thompson in the journal Telopea.  The specific epithet (crassifolium) is derived from Latin words meaning "thick" and "-leaved" referring to the texture of the leaves.

Distribution and habitat
Leptospermum crassifolium grows in sand and sandstone rock crevices on peaks in the Budawang Range.

References

crassifolium
Myrtales of Australia
Flora of New South Wales
Plants described in 1989